Adam Werbach, is an environmental activist, author, and entrepreneur. In 1996, Werbach became the youngest person ever elected as national president of the Sierra Club, at the age of 23. He is the author of the books Act Now, Apologize Later (Harper Perennial, 1997) and Strategy for Sustainability: A Business Manifesto (Harvard Business Press, 2010) Werbach is a frequent contributor to The Atlantic, serving as the magazine's online "sustainability expert."

Early life and background

A lifelong Californian, Werbach began donating to Greenpeace at age 13. He spent four months at The Mountain School, a semester school for high school juniors in Vermont. In 1990, as a high school student, he created "Big Green," an unsuccessful California voter initiative to promote fuel economy and open space. He also founded the Sierra Student Coalition, which has 30,000 members.

In 1994, while a student at Brown University, Werbach galvanized students nationwide to pass the California Desert Protection Act, which created Death Valley National Park and Joshua Tree National Park.  Werbach graduated from Brown in 1995 with a double major in Political Science and Modern Culture and Media.

Sierra Club
Werbach was a protégé of noted 20th-century environmentalist and Sierra Club Director David Brower, who hand-picked Werbach to run for the club's presidency.  Upon his election, Rolling Stone labeled him "a fixture on lists of the most influential Americans under 30."

As president of the Sierra Club, Werbach helped negotiate a behind-the-scenes agreement with the Clinton Administration to create the  Grand Staircase of the Escalante National Monument. During his first year in office, he toured the country giving more than 200 speeches. By the end of his second term, the average age of a Sierra Club member had dropped from 47 to 37. His first book, Act Now, Apologize Later, a series of essays and autobiographical anecdotes recounting the many average citizens he'd met while touring the country: "From rural priests to animal trackers, from a 12-year-old girl in California to three elderly women in Georgia, from senators to surfers and from Woody Harrelson to llama riders, an incredible array of people give us a thousand reasons to be hopeful."

After leaving The Sierra Club, Werbach formed Act Now Productions to consult to nonprofits and corporations that wished to green their enterprise, including Autodesk, Procter & Gamble, Cisco Systems, Columbia Records, Frito Lay, General Mills, Sierra Club, and World Wildlife Fund. He also co-founded the Apollo Alliance to jump-start an alternative-energy economy. In January 2008, Act Now Productions joined the global advertising firm Saatchi & Saatchi to become Saatchi & Saatchi S, which consults with large corporations to "create sustainable visions." Werbach was appointed in 2003 by San Francisco city supervisor Chris Daly to the San Francisco Public Utilities Commission while then-Mayor Willie Brown was out of town.

In April 2006, Werbach was elected to the international board of Greenpeace and was subsequently re-elected.  In 2010, Werbach published Extinction/Adaptation, a one-hundred copy limited edition book illustrated by artists Andrew Schoultz and Kyle Knobel. The book catalogued extinctions and adaptations in human behavior.

Win the Future 
In 2017, following the election of Donald Trump to the U.S. Presidency, Werbach co-founded Win the Future, a "non partisan project lab exploring and developing techniques to give more voice and choice to the American voter." As of July 2022, the website no longer operates. 

In 2018, the group announced a collaboration with political comedian Samantha Bee to develop a non-partisan voter turnout game called This is Not a Game: The Game.

Werbach worked closely with Bee to develop and launch the game in advance of the 2018 U.S. midterm elections. According to Bee, the goal was "to make something that would drive voter turnout in a bipartisan way. And I think that we have done that because somehow we have captured the voice of the show, but made it so that we're making fun of everyone — in an appropriate manner."

According to Wired magazine, "the [game's] quiz questions and answers are intended to offer insight into the often granular and murky decisions that end up on midterm ballots—so that people will be more likely to want to vote on them."

Controversy
On December 8, 2004, in a speech before the Commonwealth Club of California called "The Death of Environmentalism and the Birth of the Commons Movement", Werbach announced that the environmentalism movement was dead and stated "I am done calling myself an environmentalist." The speech suggested that advances in environmentalism had stalled, due to outdated thinking and approaches. In response to the speech, he was fired from the board of Common Assets, an environmental startup.

In 2005, Werbach generated considerable controversy in the environmental community when it was revealed that Saatchi & Saatchi was doing consulting work for Wal-Mart, creating its Personal Sustainability Project (“PSP”) to teach the company's American employees about sustainability. The move was seen as hypocritical, since Werbach had previously criticized Wal-Mart’s labor conditions, called it "a new breed of toxin" that "could wreak havoc on a town," and claimed he had set foot in a Wal-Mart store exactly once in his entire life.  Werbach lost friends and clients, received death threats, and stopped speaking in public without special security. The Sierra Club (which funds the watchdog Wal-Mart Watch) begged him to reconsider, and activists John Sellers and Barbara Dudley openly accused Werbach of abandoning his principles and integrity. Wade Rathke, founder of ACORN, stated, "For [Werbach] to believe that you and your little lonesome are changing something with a million-and-a-half employees, $350 billion of sales, well, there's a level of ego there that just is staggering... I have no idea what Adam believes anymore." Some environmentalists, however, defended Werbach; Hunter Lovins called his Wal-Mart strategy "absolutely world-changing brilliant. By the time he's done, he'll have spoken to 1% of the U.S. workforce."

In 2009, Werbach distanced himself even further from the green lobby with his book Strategy for Sustainability, an appeal to the business world to consider long-term profitability and transparency above everything else. "Environmentalism still has a role to play", he stated, "Particularly a focus on reducing the carbon in the atmosphere... But that's certainly not enough to run a company on. They've tried to use it as a business framework and it doesn't work. It's too narrow a definition."

Personal life
Werbach lives in San Francisco and Bolinas, California and is married to Lyn Merrill Werbach. They have three children Mila, Pearl, and Simon.

References

Official Website

External links
 Sierra Student Coalition
 Interview (MP3) with Adam Werbach conducted by Michael Krasny on KQED public radio (April 7, 2008)
 

American child activists
Sierra Club directors
American environmentalists
American non-fiction environmental writers
Brown University alumni
Living people
1973 births
Sierra Club presidents
Activists from California